Kopczyński (feminine: Kopczyńska; plural: Kopczyńscy) is a Polish surname. Notable people include:

 Adam Kopczyński (born 1948), Polish ice hockey player
 Jacek Kopczyński (born 1971), Polish actor
 Krzysztof Kopczyński (born 1959), Polish author
 Michał Kopczyński (born 1992), Polish footballer
 Onufry Kopczyński (1736–1817), Polish educator and scholar

See also
 

Polish-language surnames